Robert Schneider (born January 17, 1944) is a former American cyclist. He competed in the individual road race at the 1972 Summer Olympics.

References

External links
 

1944 births
Living people
American male cyclists
Olympic cyclists of the United States
Cyclists at the 1972 Summer Olympics
Sportspeople from Madison, Wisconsin